Fatme's Rescue is a 1922 Austrian silent drama film directed by Heinz Hanus and .

Cast
 Paula Tuschinsky
 Albert von Kersten
 Leopoldine Dubois
 Mizzi Griebl

References

Bibliography

External links

1922 films
Austrian silent feature films
Films directed by Heinz Hanus
Austrian black-and-white films
Austrian drama films
1922 drama films
Silent drama films
1920s German-language films